Jordan Cunningham (born December 6, 1977) is an American attorney and politician who represented the 35th district in the California State Assembly. He is a Republican who was elected in November 2016. Cunningham's district encompassed San Luis Obispo County and portions of Santa Barbara County. Prior to being elected to the state assembly, he was a school board trustee for the Templeton Unified School District and a Deputy District Attorney for San Luis Obispo County.

Early life 
Cunningham was born in San Luis Obispo, California, and grew up on the Central Coast. Cunningham graduated from Atascadero High School.

Education 
In 2000, Cunningham earned a bachelor of art degree in Physics and Economics from Point Loma Nazarene University. In 2004, Cunningham earned a JD degree from UC Berkeley School of Law.

Career 
Cunningham's career started as a prosecutor with the San Luis Obispo County District Attorney’s Office. After leaving the county, Cunningham started his own firm, Cunningham Law Group which focuses on representing families and small businesses.

Cunningham first entered politics as a member of the Templeton Unified School District Board of Trustees before successfully running for the California State Assembly in 2016.

Prior to serving in elected office, Cunningham was President of the Central Coast Taxpayers Association.

On January 13, 2022, Cunningham announced that he would not be a candidate for reelection.  Redistricting divided San Luis Obispo County made his Assembly district much more Democratic-voting.

California State Assembly

Education 
Cunningham introduced AB (Assembly Bill) 2385, which urges publishers to provide a detailed description of how newer versions of their materials differ from older ones, and AB 2580, which requires hearing officers to grant requests for hearing extensions by applying a specified standard of "good cause” in due process cases pertaining to special education matters. He co-introduced AB 1743, permanently funding the Career Technical Education Incentive Grant (CTEIG) which aims to equip students with necessary skills for the future economy.

Public safety
Cunningham introduced legislation that would improve background checks of law enforcement agencies (AB 1339) and strengthen the safety of passengers while using ride-sharing services (AB 2986).

Cunningham wrote legislation to increase protection orders for victims of human trafficking (AB 1735), and he gave trafficking victims more rights when it came time to testify in court (AB 1736). Cunningham also passed legislation which provided schools with the choice to teach their students about the dangers of trafficking and the possible consequences of "creating and sharing sexually suggestive or sexually explicit materials through cellular telephones, social networking Internet Web sites, computer networks, or other digital media" (AB 1868).

Healthcare
AB 653, introduced by Cunningham and signed into law authorizes a Santa Barbara County nonprofit hospital to enter into a joint powers agreement with a public agency. Additionally, this bill "prohibit[s] nonprofit hospitals and public agencies participating in the agreement from reducing or eliminating any emergency services following the creation of the joint powers authority without a public hearing."

Small business
In 2017 and 2018, Cunningham introduced three bills regarding small businesses on the Central Coast: AB 657 created a state liaison to advocate for employers, and AB 522 & AB 1986 allows winemakers and distillers to donate wine and spirits to nonprofits to use in fundraisers. Previously, California's Business and Professions Code prohibited nonprofits from selling donated alcoholic beverages.

Environment
Cunningham has been a vocal proponent of legislation aimed at reducing air pollution in California. In 2018, Cunningham introduced a resolution criticizing EPA rollbacks by the Trump Administration.

Cunningham, along with other Central Coast Legislators worked to lessen the impact from the closure of the Diablo Canyon Nuclear Power Plant. Cunningham and State Senator Bill Monning authored legislation that would address unemployment after the closure of the plant by providing job assistance programs to former employees. Cunningham also worked on legislation that provided an $85 million settlement for San Luis Obispo County to address impacts from the closure.

Elections

2016 election
Cunningham was elected to the California State Assembly in 2016 winning  55% of the vote over solar energy consultant Dawn Ortiz-Legg. After being elected, Cunningham detailed his priorities for office as increasing water infrastructure on the Central Coast by using Prop 1 funds. He is focused on improving access to Career Technical Education, and improving small business climate in California and on the Central Coast.

2018 election 
In the 2018 election, Cunningham won re-election to the State Assembly, defeating Democratic farmer Bill Ostrander with 56% of the vote. In San Luis Obispo County, he won with 55% of the vote. In Santa Barbara County, he won with 59% of the vote. On December 3, 2018, he was sworn in for his second term representing the Central Coast and the 35th Assembly District.

2020 election
In the 2020 election, Cunningham overcame the Democratic challenger, Morro Bay City Councilwoman Dawn Addis.

Personal life 
Cunningham's wife is Shauna Cunningham. They have four children.

References

External links 
 
 Campaign website

Republican Party members of the California State Assembly
UC Berkeley School of Law alumni
Point Loma Nazarene University alumni
People from San Luis Obispo County, California
Living people
21st-century American politicians
1977 births